The Skymines of Karthos is a Big Finish Productions audio drama featuring Lisa Bowerman as Bernice Summerfield, a character from the spin-off media based on the long-running British science fiction television series Doctor Who.

Plot 
Caitlin Peters, a friend of Bernice's, disappears on the mining colony of Karthos. When Bernice visits the planet, she finds herself under attack from a race of vicious alien creatures.

Cast
Bernice Summerfield - Lisa Bowerman
Irving Braxiatel - Miles Richardson
Caitlin Peters - Rebecca Jackson
Michael Peters - Jimmy Wilson
Doctor Konstantin - Johnson Willis

External links
Big Finish Productions - Professor Bernice Summerfield: The Skymines of Karthos

Bernice Summerfield audio plays
Fiction set in the 27th century